Vic Bodsworth (10 July 1931 – 3 December 1967) was an Australian rules footballer who played with Footscray in the Victorian Football League (VFL).

Bodsworth, a locally recruited rover, made his way up from the thirds to play two VFL seasons at Footscray.

He then joined Yarraville in the Victorian Football Association.

Bodsworth also spent some time playing for Daylesford in the Ballarat Football League and won a Henderson Medal in 1954.

After leaving Daylesford, he returned to Yarraville, then signed with Minyip as coach.

References

1931 births
1967 deaths
Western Bulldogs players
Yarraville Football Club players
Daylesford Football Club players
Minyip Football Club players
Australian rules footballers from Victoria (Australia)